United Nations Conference Centre may refer to:

United Nations Conference Centre (Addis Ababa) in Ethiopia, administered by UNECA
United Nations Conference Centre (Bangkok) in Thailand, administered by UNESCAP